Dalesandro is a surname. Notable people with the surname include:

 Mark Dalesandro (born 1968), American baseball player
 Sonny Dalesandro (born 1977), American soccer player and restaurateur

See also
 D'Alessandro